Musa Jafar Qasimli (born 28 October 1957) is an Azerbaijani historian, doctor of historical sciences, professor, member of the Azerbaijani National Assembly by IVth and Vth convocation (2010 - 2015; 2015 –2019) and Director of the Institute of the Caucasus Studies of the Azerbaijan National Academy of Sciences (2016), corresponding member of ANAS (2017).

Biography
Musa Gasımlı was born on 28 October 1957 in the Yardımlı district of Azerbaijan. In 1974 he finished secondary school with distinction. In the same year he enrolled in the faculty of History at Azerbaijan State University (now known as Baku State University) and graduated in 1979 with honours. He worked in the Yardımlı district on assignment. From 1982 to 1985 he studied as a postgraduate student (full-time) at the department of New and Modern History of European and American countries, at Baku State University. He specialized in history of international relations. In 1986 he defended his candidate thesis and at age 35 his doctoral dissertation thesis. He was the youngest person in Azerbaijan to become a doctor of historical sciences. He is the first Professor and Doctor of Historical Sciences from the Yardımlı district. From 1986 to 1992 he worked as a lecturer, senior lecturer, associate professor and deputy dean at the Department of New and Modern History of European and American countries at Baku State University. Currently he is a professor at the Department of New and Modern History of European and American countries at Baku State University.

By the decision of the Presidium of ANAS dated 27 January 2016, he was appointed as the acting-director of the Institute of Caucasus Studies. On June 24, at the meeting of the ANAS Social Sciences Department, he was elected as the director (by vote) and on 29 June the decision was approved at the Presidium of ANAS meeting.

From 1992 to 1997, he worked at the Department of International Relations at the National Assembly of the Republic of Azerbaijan.
He was elected as an MP by the IVth convocation to the Milli Majlis of the Republic of Azerbaijan held on November 7, 2010 (from the Sumgayit second election constituency No.42) and by the Yardımlı-Masallı election constituency No.72 as the result of the Vth convocation elections held on November 1, 2015.

He is a member of Milli Majlis's Committee on Science and Education. He is also a Member of a working party for inter-parliamentary relations with Turkey, Canada, Brazil, Peru, Mexico, Argentina, Denmark, Malta, Estonia, Bosnia and Herzegovina, as well as the chairman of a working party for inter-parliamentary relations with Afghanistan's parliament.

Mr. Gasımlı is a member of the Board of Directors of Azerbaijan Press Council and World Azerbaijanis’ Coordination Council.

Scientific career

His name is associated with the study and research of several essential issues– Azerbaijan's International cultural relations (1946-1991), UN discussion of conditions in Southern Azerbaijan after the movement of Sayyed Ja’far Pishevari, Political relations between Azerbaijan and Turkey (1920 - 1922), Foreign countries and Azerbaijan (1920 - 1922), The activities of Armenian armed “volunteer” gangs during the First World War, The policies of the great powers towards Azerbaijan during the First World War (1914 - 1918), Diplomatic and political relations between Turkey and the USSR (1960-1991), Azerbaijan and foreign countries (1920 - 1945), The “Armenian issue” to “Armenian genocide” (1724 - 1920), The South Caucasus and Entente countries and Relations between Russia and Turkey (1920 - 1923). Musa Gasimli has worked in the archives and published many valuable articles in Azerbaijan, Russia, Turkey, United States, Georgia, UN in Austria, OSCE in the Czech Republic and the UK. His first major research work was in relation to Azerbaijan's international and cultural relations during the period after World War II until the Soviet Union's collapse. It was a successful start to research the dynamics of international and cultural relations during this period. The results of the study were based on rich archives under the control of the center during Soviet rule. This monograph which was published in Baku also was published at “Artanudji” press in Georgia. From 1992 to 1993 Musa Gasimli discussed conditions in Iranian Azerbaijan after the Sayyed Ja’far Pishevari movement at the newly established UN General Assembly and in 1993 published his research paper, "Azerbaijan in International Politics", at "Azernashr" press. This was a first step in Azerbaijani History.

Gasimli raised the essence of disputes relating to Soviets troops in Iran between two representatives originally from Azerbaijan: an envoy from the Soviet Union in the UN (A.Vishinski) and an envoy from Iran (originally from the Ordubad region in Azerbaijan) - Sayyed Hasan Tagizadeh. He also touched upon US and Soviet politics in Iranian Azerbaijan. The author writes that the West believes that the Cold War was started first in Europe, but in fact the crisis emerged from Iranian Azerbaijan.

Musa Gasimli denotes in his article: “...for many years in non-scientific theses, the concept that the US and other Western countries were guilty for the Cold War dominated”. Now the “cold war” has ended. The main guilty party of this war, the Soviet empire, collapsed and the West was victorious. The issue of Azerbaijan became one of the most controversial in the field of international relations and was the first seed into the cold war after the former British Prime Minister Winston Churchill’s speech in Fulton in March 1945 (page 24-25). This was a new concept in Azerbaijani and world history that was first introduced by Musa Gasimli. Later, other Azerbaijani historians under Musa Gasimli’s supervision conducted research on this issue and developed the concept of the start of the Cold war crisis in Iranian Azerbaijan. Professor Jamil Hasanli says in his article “South Azerbaijan: between Tehran – Baku – Moscow (1939 – 1945)” published in 1998, that Professor Musa Gasimli's book “The Issue of Azerbaijan in International Relations” can be considered as one of the most successful steps during recent years" (page 12–13). Also, Professor Musa Gasimli researched the diplomatic and political relations of Azerbaijan with other countries, including Turkey, and the period of Bolshevik occupation until the establishment of the Soviet Union. These years involved a short period of independence of Azerbaijan. The author researched the means of Bolshevik Russia that put an end to Azerbaijan's foreign policy and closed representative offices. Along with Baku, this research was published as a book in Turkey and Iran. Professor Musa Gasimli for the first time in his country studied the policy of great powers towards Azerbaijan during World War I. In relation to this he is the author of a three-volume monograph.  He investigated the activities of armed Armenian “volunteer” gangs in the South Caucasus. On this subject he gave a number of speeches in international scientific symposiums and those reports have been published. Musa Gasimli also studied Azerbaijan's struggle for independence and problems with foreign countries during 1920–1945, wrote a large-volume monograph and the study was published in Istanbul's “Kaknus” Press in 2006. The book was one of the best-selling books at a book fair in Frankfurt, Germany.

Gasimli also studied the diplomatic and political struggle for influence between Russia, Turkey and Entente countries in the South Caucasus from 1920 to 1923. The professor also published a monograph based on the most reliable materials and archives related to the period starting from the decree of the Russian Emperor Peter the Great, until Armenian SSR in 1920, regarding the placement of Armenians in Azerbaijani territories, the capture of land, creation of armed gangs, as well as large-scale massacres of civil Muslim and Turkish populations. The monograph was published in Azerbaijani, Russian, Turkish and English in different countries.

14 large scale monographs and also about 82 scientific articles involving subjects which had never before been researched in Azerbaijani history until that time were published in the US, Argentina, Turkey, Great Britain, Germany, Russia, Ukraine, Poland, Romania, Kazakhstan, Macedonia, Moldova, Georgia, Iran, Cyprus, Czech Republic and other countries in English, Spanish, Turkish, Russian, Ukrainian, Polish, Persian and other languages. Many positive reviews about the monographs have been published abroad. Many scientists from the United States, Russia, Turkey, Ukraine, Georgia, Iraq, Poland, and Romania have relied on his works in their articles.

The works published in Azerbaijan and abroad have brought him fame and recognition as an outstanding historian. From 1983 to 2014 he lectured at more than 30 scientific conferences in Azerbaijan. From 1985 to 2015 he represented Azerbaijani history at more than 50 international conferences held in Orlando, San Francisco, Los Angeles (USA), Plovdiv (Bulgaria), Kraków, Warsaw (Poland), Bilkent, Istanbul, Ankara, Elazig, Erzurum, Igdir, Ardahan, Trabzon, Izmir, Edirne, Bandirma, Eskisehir, Ushak, Bitlis, Malatya, Kayseri, Kahramanmarash,  Giresun, Bayburt (Turkey), Moscow, Yekaterinburg, Nizhny Novgorod (Russia), Tbilisi, Batumi (Georgia), Gazimagosa, Nicosia, Girne (Cyprus), Tehran, Tabriz (Iran), Vilnius (Lithuania), Odessa, Kiev (Ukraine), Turkistan (Kazakhstan), Tallinn (Estonia), Amsterdam (Holland), Frankfurt, Cologne, Berlin, Dortmund, Bielefeld, Hamburg (Germany), Skopje (Macedonia), Vienna (Austria) and Budapest (Hungary). 
 
He is the author of a two-volume History of International Relations textbook regarding Modern History of European and American countries, as well as subject programmes for universities. He is an associate member of the Middle East Research Association (Arizona University), Central Eurasia Research Society (Harvard University), Research Centre of Central Asia and Caucasus Studies (Turkey) and also a member of the International Staff Academy in Ukraine (Kiev).  He is a member of the editorial boards of various scientific journals: “Romania Eurasia Studies” (Romania), “Caucasus and Central Asia Studies”, “Turan SAM”, “Turkish Studies”, “Atatürk yolu” (Turkey), “Qafqaz I mir” (Georgia), “Istoriya” (Ukraine).

He has worked on a research programme at George Mason University in Fairfax, Virginia, USA.  He worked as a member of the Scientific Council of the History of International Relations and Foreign Policy in the USSR Sciences Academy under the USSR Political Sciences Association (1987-1991), the co-chairman of the doctoral Defense Council of the History Institute under Azerbaijan Sciences Academy (1997-1999), a member of the Scientific Methodological Council of the Ministry of Education (1997-1999) and Textbook Evaluation Council (2009-2014), and as a member of the Specialist Council on History and Political Sciences of Higher Attestation Commission under the President of the Republic of Azerbaijan (2004-2007).
 
He is a member of the Defense Council of Baku State University. Fourteen candidacy and three doctoral dissertation defenses have been examined by Professor Musa Gasimli. He is a member of the Scientific Council of the Faculty of History at Baku State University. He was awarded with the medal of “Distinguished education worker” by the Ministry of Education of the Republic of Azerbaijan in 2009.

Selected publications

In Azerbaijan

 The Republic of Azerbaijan in World Meridians. Baku. Ganjlik, 1992, 5.58.pp
 Azerbaijan Issue in the International relations. Baku. Azerneshr, 1993, 4.2pp
 Azerbaijan in the system of the International relations (1991–1995 years) Baku. Ganjlik. 1996. 8.7pp
 Azerbaijan and International parliamentary organizations. (together with N.Akhundov) Baku. Mutarjim, 1996. 5.5pp
 The foreign policy of Azerbaijan (concept issues) Baku. Mutarjim 1997. 7.5pp
 Diplomatic and political relations between Azerbaijan and Turkey (April 1920 year-December 1922 year) Baku. Mutarjim. 1998. 7.5pp
 Foreign states and Azerbaijan (Diplomatic and political relations in period after April occupation until creation of the USSR). Baku. 1998. 22.5 pp.
 Azerbaijan policy of Great Power in the First World War years (1914–1918 years). In 3 part. 1st part. (August 1914 year-October 1917 year). Baku. Qanun. 2000, 15 pp.
 Azerbaijan policy of Great Power in I World War years (1914–1918 years). In 3 part. 2nd part (November 1917 year- November 1918 year) Baku. Adiloglu, 2001, 15 pp.
 Ministers of Foreign Affairs (together with E.Huseynov) Baku. Adiloglu, 2003, 7 pp. Baku. Mutarjim 2013, 9pp. Republished.
 Azerbaijan policy of Great Power in I World War years (1914–1918 years). In 3 part. 3rd part (documents, materials maps, pictures). Baku. Adiloglu. 2004, 35pp.
 The Prime Ministers of Azerbaijan (together with Javad Huseynov). Baku. Adiloglu 2005, 8.3 pp.
 Haydar Aliev-The road to independence. 1969–1987 years. Baku. Publishing of BSU, 2006, 38 pp.
 USSR-Turkey relations (after revolution of 1960 year until the collapse of the USSR in Turkey) I volume. 1960–1979. Baku. Adiloglu, 2007, 560p.
 USSR-Turkey relations (after revolution of 1960 year until the collapse of the USSR in Turkey) II volume. 1979–1991. Baku. Adiloglu, 2009, 400p.
 From the “Armenian Issue” to “The Armenian Genocide”: in Search of Historical Truth (1724-1920). Baku. Mutarjim. 2014, 464 p.
 From the “Armenian Issue” to “The Armenian Genocide”: in Search of Historical Truth (1720-1920). Baku. “N print studio” LLC. 2015, 492 p.
 Foreign policy of the Republic of Azerbaijan (1991-2003) I part. Baku. Mutarjim. 2015. 648p.
 Foreign policy of the Republic of Azerbaijan (1991-2003) II part. Baku. Mutarjim. 2015. 664p

In foreign countries

 Southern Azerbaijan Issue in the International relations (40 years) Ankara. Asana press. 1997.80 p.Turkey.
 Azerbaijan-Turkey diplomatic and political relations (April 1920 year-December 1922). Tabriz. Tabriz press, 1999 (translated into Persian by Ali Dashkin). 7.5 pp (Iran).
 Azerbaijan in international cultural relations (1946-1990). Tbilisi. Artanudzhi Press, 2005. 15 pp (Georgia).
 History of the National struggle of Azerbaijani Turks.1920-1940. Istanbul. Kaknus Press, 2006. 704 p. (Turkey).
 USSR-Turkey: from normalization to a new Cold War. 1960–1979 years. Moscow. Insan, 2008. 576p (Russia).
 Turkey-USSR: from the coup until the collapse. 1980–1991. Moscow. Insan. 2010. 418p (Russia).
 USSR-Turkey relations. From 1980 Coup in Turkey until the collapse of the USSR. Istanbul. Kaknus. 2012. 464p (Turkey).
 Ukrainian-Azerbaijani political relations: history and modernity. Kiev. Dmitry Burago Publishing House, Kiev,2012 (Ukraine).
 Turkey- USSR relations. Ankara. Atatürk Research Center Publications. 2013. 599p (Turkey).
 Anatolia and the South Caucasus in 1724–1920 years: in search of historical truth. Moscow. Insan, 2014. 550p. (Russia).
 The "Armenian Issue" in the Caucasus. 1724–1920. Ankara. Ipek University publications. 2014. 484p (Turkey).
 Azerbaijan, Armenia and Turkey in 1920-1994: the real history. Moscow. Insan, 2016. 560 p. (Russia).
 Foreign Policy of the Republic of Azerbaijan (1991-2003). I vol. Moscow. Insan, 2016. 704 p. (Russia).
 Foreign Policy of the Republic of Azerbaijan (1991-2003). II vol. Moscow. Insan, 2016. 720 p. (Russia).

References

External links

Qasimli Musa Djafar oglu - Baku State University
Musa Gasimli`s books
Musa Gasimli: “A quarter of the Azerbaijani population was massacred in Baku in 1918”
Director of the Institute of the Caucasus Studies

1957 births
20th-century Azerbaijani historians
People from Yardimli District
Soviet historians
Living people
Recipients of the Azerbaijan Democratic Republic 100th anniversary medal
21st-century Azerbaijani historians